Phinney Creek flows into the Oaks Creek south of Lidell Corners, New York.

References

Rivers of Otsego County, New York
Rivers of New York (state)